Mark Wartman (born August 20, 1951) is a Canadian provincial politician. He was the Saskatchewan New Democratic Party member of the Legislative Assembly of Saskatchewan for the constituency of Regina Qu'Appelle Valley from 1999 to 2007. He served as Agriculture Minister for Saskatchewan.

He currently works as a private fundraising consultant and serves on the non-profit board of directors for carmichael outreach in Regina, Saskatchewan.

References

Living people
Saskatchewan New Democratic Party MLAs
Members of the United Church of Canada
1951 births
Politicians from Regina, Saskatchewan
Politicians from Saskatoon
21st-century Canadian politicians